Jean François Pons (1688–1752) was a French Jesuit who pioneered the study of Sanskrit in the West.

He published a survey of Sanskrit literature in 1743, where he described the language as "admirable for its harmony, copiousness, and energy", reporting on the parsimony of the native grammatical tradition, informing the works of de Brosses, Dow, Sinner, Voltaire, Monboddo, Halhed, Beauzée, and Hervás, and was plagiarized by John Cleland (1778).

References
Rosane Rocher, "Discovery of Sanskrit by Europeans" in Concise history of the language sciences from the Sumerians to the cognitivists, E. F. K. Koerner & R. E. Asher (eds.), 1995, p. 188.
Rosane Rocher, Lord Monboddo, Sanskrit and Comparative Linguistics, Journal of the American Oriental Society (1980).
H.W. Bodewitz, De late ‘ontdekking’ van het Sanskrit en de Oudindische cultuur in Europa, Leiden University thesis (2002).

18th-century French Jesuits
French philologists
French Indologists
1688 births
1752 deaths